Bruce Flowers (born June 13, 1957) is an American former professional basketball player. At a height of 2.04 m (6 ft 8  in) tall, he played as a power forward. Flowers is one of the few American players to have won all three of the different major European titles during his playing era, meaning the EuroLeague, as well as the now defunct FIBA Saporta Cup and FIBA Korać Cup competitions.

Professional career

NBA
Flowers was drafted 26th overall by the Cleveland Cavaliers in the 1979 NBA draft, but only appeared in one NBA season.

Europe
Starting his European pro career in Cantù, he helped them win both the Italian League championship and the 1980–81 FIBA Saporta Cup. Flowers would add the EuroLeague title with Cantù in 1981–82, scoring 21 points in the EuroLeague Final against Maccabi, and he later captured the FIBA Korać Cup trophy with Virtus Roma in 1985–86.

On February 3, 2008, Flowers was among the 105 player nominees for the 50 Greatest EuroLeague Contributors list, commemorating the fiftieth anniversary of the competition.

References

External links 
Euroleague 50 Greatest Contributors - Nominees
NBA Profile and Stats at Basketball-Reference.com

1957 births
Living people
American expatriate basketball people in Italy
American men's basketball players
Basketball players from New York (state)
Cleveland Cavaliers draft picks
Cleveland Cavaliers players
Notre Dame Fighting Irish men's basketball players
Pallacanestro Cantù players
Parade High School All-Americans (boys' basketball)
Power forwards (basketball)
Sportspeople from Rochester, New York